|}

The Weatherbys Ireland EBF Mares Bumper is a Grade 3 National Hunt flat race in Ireland for amateur riders which is open to mares and fillies aged four to seven years. It is run at Punchestown over a distance of about 2 miles and ½ furlong (2 miles and 70 yards, or 3,283 metres), and it is scheduled to take place each year during the Punchestown Festival in late April or early May.

The race (also known as the Liss A Paoraigh EBF Bumper) was first run as a Listed race in 2016.  From 2017, the race was awarded Group 3 status, and all penalties were abolished thus making it a mares' equivalent of the Champion INH Flat Race.

Records
Most successful jockey (3 wins):
 Patrick Mullins -  Augusta Kate (2016), Colreevy (2018), Grangee (2021) 

Most successful trainer (3 wins): 
 Willie Mullins–  Augusta Kate (2016), Colreevy (2018), Grangee (2021)

Winners

See also
 Horse racing in Ireland
 List of Irish National Hunt races

References

Racing Post: 

National Hunt races in Ireland
National Hunt flat races
Punchestown Racecourse
Recurring sporting events established in 2016
2016 establishments in Ireland